The Lawyer is a legal business information product for law firm leaders, commercial lawyers, barristers and in-house counsel. It is based in London.

History and profile 
The Lawyer was launched in 1987 by Centaur Media plc. It published a once-weekly magazine for 30 years until May 2017, when the frequency changed to monthly. The brand’s focus is now online and it no longer publishes a print magazine; the last monthly issue was published in July 2021. The Lawyer has a spin-off online brand for students and aspiring lawyers called Lawyer 2B.

As well as the legal news and analysis website TheLawyer.com, The Lawyer information products include Signal and Litigation Tracker.

Litigation Tracker was launched in 2019 and publishes litigation news and analysis, and maintains a searchable database of case and claims data from 15 UK high courts.

Signal launched in March 2021. It produces research reports that benchmark the performance, financials, resources and strategies of law firms across four legal market channels: the UK, International, US firms in London and the Disputes market.

Most content on the news website TheLawyer.com is paywalled, requiring a personal or corporate subscription to access. The Signal and Litigation Tracker products are also available on a subscription basis.

The Lawyer also runs a portfolio of events comprising legal conferences, roundtables, webinars and awards. In June 2020 it launched its first virtual event - the In-house Financial Services Conference.

The Lawyer has an in-house research team that produces the Signal and Litigation Tracker market reports. The research team also offers custom research and analysis service for external clients.

Awards 
The brand runs a number of awards ceremonies for the legal profession: The Lawyer Awards and The Lawyer European Awards. The Lawyer also publishes an annual celebration of excellence in the legal profession called The Hot 100.

The UK 200, the Euro 100 and the Top 50 US firms in London 
The Lawyer publishes annual rankings and analyses of the UK and international legal markets, including The UK 200, The European 100, and the Top 50 US Law Firms in London.

Editors 
The Lawyer has had five editors since it was founded.

References

External links
 
 

1987 establishments in the United Kingdom
Business magazines published in the United Kingdom
Weekly magazines published in the United Kingdom
Law of the United Kingdom
Legal magazines
Magazines established in 1987
Professional and trade magazines
Monthly magazines published in the United Kingdom